Perfect Sound Whatever is a 2019 book by James Acaster charting his project to catalogue the music of 2016, with the aim of proving that 2016 was 'the best year for music ever'.

Synopsis 
In 2017, Acaster broke up with his girlfriend and terminated his relationship with his agent. He was also exhausted from recording several live stand up specials and an unrelenting touring schedule. This combination of events left him feeling depressed and lost. Acaster found solace in purchasing music albums from the year 2016, initially as an effort to reconnect with music, something he had previously got great joy from, and felt that he had lost. Eventually, this project saw him purchasing over 500 albums from various artists and genres, the only thing connecting them being the publication year of 2016. Eventually, Acaster becomes convinced that 2016 was 'the best year for music ever'.

The book lists all the albums that Acaster purchased as part of his project, with a brief description of each one, accompanied by various stories from Acaster's earlier life, his experience playing in the band 'The Wow! Scenario' and the events that led up to the project.

Albums featured in the book 
 Worry by Jeff Rosenstock
 The Dreaming Room by Laura Mvula
 Lemonade by Beyoncé
 Blackstar by David Bowie
 Splendor & Misery by Clipping
 The Life of Pablo by Kanye West
 A Seat at the Table by Solange Knowles
 Untitled Unmastered by Kendrick Lamar
 Telefone by Noname
 The Party by Andy Shauf
 A Moon Shaped Pool by Radiohead
 Skeleton Tree by Nick Cave and the Bad Seeds
 22, A Million by Bon Iver
 Blonde by Frank Ocean
 Howdilly Doodilly by Okilly Dokilly

References 

British memoirs
Books about entertainers
2019 non-fiction books
Headline Publishing Group books